Tullibardine Chapel is an ancient church building in Tullibardine, Perth and Kinross, Scotland. It is one of the most complete medieval churches in Scotland. A large part of it dating to 1446, it is now a scheduled monument.

The chapel was built by Sir David Murray, Baron of Tullibardine (formerly of Ochtertyre), of Tullibardine Castle, as a family chapel and burial site. Members of the Murray family (subsidiaries of the Dukes of Atholl) were buried there until 1900. An armorial plaque on the north external wall of the chancel displays the coat of arms of David and his wife, Isabel Stewart.

The chapel was rebuilt or extended with transepts and a small tower around 1500 by David's sons, William Murray (died 1513), who built the "part towards the west where his father's coat of arms is impaled". and Andrew Murray. Arms on the south transept gable relate to the marriage of Andrew Murray, a younger son of David Murray, and his wife Margaret Barclay. They were ancestors of the Murray of Balvaird family.

The chapel has remained unaltered to this day.

See also
Scheduled monuments in Perth and Kinross

References

External links
Tullibardine Chapel video with narration

Scheduled Ancient Monuments in Perth and Kinross
Churches completed in 1446
Churches in Perth and Kinross
Listed churches in Scotland